Roller skating and roller hockey were contested at the 1979 Pan American Games, held in San Juan, Puerto Rico.

Roller skating

Men's events
Speed

Artistic

Women's events
Speed

Artistic

Mixed events

Roller hockey

Men

Medal table

References

1979 Pan American Games
International sports competitions hosted by Puerto Rico
1979 Pan American Games
1979